NJOY (trade name of NJOY, LLC) is an independent American company that manufactures and distributes electronic cigarettes and vaping products. In 2017, NJOY acquired the assets of NJOY, Inc., one of the first companies to sell e-cigarettes.

History 
NJOY, founded in 2007, was one of the first major e-cigarette brands in the US.

In 2010, the company won a landmark lawsuit against the Food and Drug Administration. The decision by the US Court of Appeals upheld a lower court ruling finding that the FDA lacked authority to regulate electronic cigarettes as drugs or medical devices, absent therapeutic claims. The court further held that FDA could seek to regulate electronic cigarettes via the FDA's authority under the Family Smoking Prevention and Tobacco Control Act of 2009, as argued by NJOY.  In response, FDA announced that it would accept the Court of Appeals decision and would regulate the category under the Tobacco Control Act rather than under the agency's drug jurisdiction. The lawsuit thereby established the legal framework for the electronic cigarette/vaping industry.

Originally NJOY achieved commercial success following the resolution of its lawsuit with FDA.  Much of this early success was due to well-received launch of the NJOY KING, a disposable electronic cigarette in a package and form factor that looks like a cigarette. Main product features included a white paper wrapping, a faux filter, and a red “ember” that lights when you draw. The King had no button to push and nothing to charge. The King brought in $90 million in revenue in 2013. By 2014, NJOY was ranked number one by IRI in US vaping retail sales with over 90,000 points of distribution. NJOY's stated mission is to “make smoking history.” NJOY supplies e-cigarettes for independent, government-funded studies on smoking and e-cigarettes.

In 2022, the FDA authorized several NJOY e-cigarette products to be legally marketed in the U.S.

Altria has purchased 100% of NJOY.

https://www.bizjournals.com/phoenix/news/2023/03/09/altria-group-inc-acquiring-njoy-holdings-inc.html

Products 
In the years following the King's launch, NJOY expanded its product offerings to include open system vape liquids, a closed system vape device called the PFT, a new disposable electronic cigarette called the DAILY, a rechargeable device called the LOOP, and a pod-based vape device called the ACE.

NJOY's current leading products are the DAILY, LOOP and ACE:

The NJOY DAILY is a disposable e-cigarette. Each DAILY provides approximately 300 puffs, comparable to 1 full pack of cigarettes. There are eight flavors and a choice of 4.5% or 6% nicotine strengths.
The NJOY ACE has a compact design with longer batter life. It uses a magnetic pod system to help prevent leakage and spills. There used to be four flavors: Blueberry, Watermelon, Classic Tobacco, and Mint with 5.0%  nicotine strength delivering about 325 puffs per pod. Now, there are only 2 flavor choices: Classic Tobacco and Menthol with 5.0% or 2.4% nicotine delivering the same amount of puffs per pod. NJOY voluntarily stopped producing and selling the fruity flavors due to lawmakers and anti-vaping advocates that were concerned about underage people obtaining and getting addicted to them.
The LOOP is a continuous battery charging case accessory with two rechargeable e-cigarettes inside. There are 4 flavors at 4% nicotine strength with approximately 150 puffs per pod.

People 
The company's early individual investors include Sean Parker, Peter Thiel, Douglas Teitelbaum and Bruno Mars.

In 2013, former Surgeon General and physician Richard Carmona joined the company's Board of Directors, also serving in a scientific advisory role.

In 2015, NJOY named former Global President and General Manager of Pfizer's Consumer Health Care Business, Paul Sturman as CEO & President.

References

Smoking in the United States
Electronic cigarette manufacturers